Sakarya University of Applied Sciences (Turkish: Sakarya Uygulamalı Bilimler Üniversitesi), was established with the Decree Law published in the Official Gazette dated 18 May 2018. The school has 1 institute, 8 faculties, 1 college and 15 vocational schools. These units were affiliated to Sakarya University before the university was established. In addition, the University of Applied Sciences is one of two universities in Turkey.

Academic Units

Institute 
 Institute of Master Studies

Fakülteler 
 Faculty of Sport Sciences
 Faculty of Technology
 Faculty of Tourism
 Faculty of Applies Sciences
 Western Black Sea Faculty of Marine Sciences
 Faculty of Health Sciences
 Faculty of Transport and Logistics
 Ali Fuat Paşa Faculty of Agricultural Sciences and Technologies

Schools 
 School of Foreign Languages

Vocational Schools 
 Vocational School of Akyazı
 Vocational School of Arifiye
 Vocational School of Ferizli
 Vocational School of Geyve
 Vocational School of Hendek
 Vocational School of Karasu
 Vocational School of Karapürçek
 Vocational School of Kaynarca Seyfettin Selim
 Vocational School of Kocaali
 Vocational School of Pamukova
 Vocational School of Sakarya (Adapazarı)
 Vocational School of Sapanca
 Vocational School Sapanca Tourism
 Vocational School of Söğütlü
 Vocational School of Taraklı

Professional Application Management System (MUYS) 
Thanks to the system created by the university to manage professional practices, it applies a 3 + 1 education model for Vocational Schools and 7 + 1 education for faculties. In addition, the system helps the student to provide job opportunities.

References

 
Universities and colleges in Turkey